Daniel Jackson may refer to:

Daniel Jackson (basketball) (born 1988), Australian basketball player
Daniel Jackson (computer scientist) (born 1963), professor of computer science
Daniel Jackson (footballer) (born 1986), Australian rules footballer
Daniel Jackson (playwright) (born 1980), Scottish playwright, also known as D.C. Jackson
Daniel Jackson (soccer) (born 1989), American soccer player
Daniel Jackson (Stargate), a fictional character in the Stargate science fiction franchise
Daniel Jackson, a fictional character from Saving Private Ryan
Daniel Jackson (politician), President of the micronation Verdis

See also
Dan Jackson (born 1993), Costa Rican-American soccer player
Danny Jackson (born 1962), American baseball pitcher